Laurence Courtois and Nancy Feber defeated Hiroko Mochizuki and Yuka Yoshida in the final, 6–3, 6–4 to win the girls' doubles tennis title at the 1993 Wimbledon Championships.

Seeds

  Laurence Courtois /  Nancy Feber (champions)
  Cristina Moros /  Julie Steven (quarterfinals)
  María Dolores Campana /  Bárbara Castro (second round)
  Park Sung-hee /  Romana Tedjakusuma (semifinals)
  Hiroko Mochizuki /  Yuka Yoshida (final)
  Magalí Benítez /  María Landa (quarterfinals)
  Julie Pullin /  Lorna Woodroffe (quarterfinals)
  Martina Hingis /  Joana Manta (semifinals)

Draw

Finals

Top half

Bottom half

References

External links

Girls' Doubles
Wimbledon Championship by year – Girls' doubles